Donna Freitas (pronounced FRAY-tus) (born 1972) is a scholar, teacher, writer, and author of fiction and non-fiction for both adults and teenagers. Born in Rhode Island, the most Catholic state in the United States, Freitas's Catholic religion and spirituality inform much of her writing. Her writing also addresses sexuality, consent, and college campus culture.

Early life and education 
Freitas was a gymnast for 7 years, but at age fifteen she retired because of injuries. She received a B.A. in philosophy and Spanish from Georgetown University. She received her Ph.D. in religion from Catholic University of America.

Career

Academic institution positions 

Freitas taught at Boston University in the Department of Religion and Hofstra University in the Honors College. Freitas has lectured at over 200 college campuses about sexual assault.

Freitas currently serves as a research affiliate at the University of Notre Dame's Center for the Study of Religion and Society.

Writing 
Sex & the Soul: Juggling Sexuality, Spirituality, Romance, and Religion on America's College Campuses (2008) addresses the connections between sexuality and spirituality/religion at seven United States universities and colleges, including non-religious public, secular private, Catholic private, and evangelical private institutions. Her research included an online survey, with more than 2,500 responses, as well as interviews. One hundred and eleven students were interviewed: 48 men and 63 women. Freitas concluded that the largest conflicts between sexuality and spirituality were between evangelical and non-evangelical institutions, rather than religious and non-religious ones. Freitas argued that students enrolled in Catholic institutions responded in a similar way as those at non-religious institutions. Overall, students did not find that their sexuality and spirituality/religion informed each other very much. On the other hand, Freitas discovered that students in evangelical institutions made conscious efforts to reconcile their sexuality with their spirituality/religion perhaps because they more often self-identified as religious and spiritual. Sex & the Soul is the first major study investigating young people's attempts at reconciling spirituality and sexuality. Freitas called for real-life solutions to these conflicts.
 
Consent on Campus: A Manifesto (2018) explored the widespread problem of sexual assault and sexual violence on college campuses. Freitas argues that this problem is because of both the widespread failure of colleges and universities to educate students about sex and consent and "hookup culture." Freitas aimed to provide a more complete education about consent and proposed ways to have more constructive conversations. Freitas argued that consensual sex must be communicative.

Consent: A Memoir of Unwanted Attention (2019) explained the personal dimensions of Freitas's work with consent on college campuses. In the 1990s at the Catholic University of America, a professor and priest ("Father L") harassed Freitas. This book explored Freitas's experiences with the ways in which Father L's mentorship quickly changed into harassment and stalking and how her university's administration did little to help.

Works

Fiction

 The Possibilities of Sainthood (2008) 
This Gorgeous Game (2010) 
The Survival Kit (2011) 
Gold Medal Summer (2012) 
Gold Medal Winter (2014) 
The Tenderness of Thieves (2015) 
Unplugged (2016) 
The Body Market (2017) 
The Mind Virus (2017) 
The Healer (2018) 
 The Nine Lives of Rose Napolitano (2021)

Non-fiction

Becoming a Goddess of Inner Poise: Spirituality for the Bridget Jones in All of Us (2003) 
Killing the Imposter God: Philip Pullman's Spiritual Imagination in His Dark Materials (2007) 
Sex & the Soul: Juggling Sexuality, Spirituality, Romance, and Religion on America's College Campuses (2008) 
The End of Sex: How Hookup Culture is Leaving a Generation Unhappy, Sexually Unfulfilled, and Confused About Intimacy (2013) 
 Consent on Campus: A Manifesto (2018) 
 Consent: A Memoir of Unwanted Attention (2019) 
The Happiness Effect: How Social Media is Driving a Generation to Appear Perfect at Any Cost (2019)

References 

1972 births
Living people
American Roman Catholics
Georgetown College (Georgetown University) alumni
Catholic University of America alumni
Boston University faculty
Hofstra University faculty
21st-century American non-fiction writers
21st-century American women writers
American relationships and sexuality writers
American women academics